Emotional intimacy is an aspect of interpersonal relationships that varies in intensity from one relationship to another and varies from one time to another, much like physical intimacy. Emotional intimacy involves a perception of closeness to another, sharing of personal feelings, and personal validation.

Description 

Emotional intimacy can be expressed in verbal and non-verbal communication. The degree of comfort, effectiveness, and mutual experience of closeness might indicate emotional intimacy between individuals. Intimate communication is both expressed (e.g. talking) and implied (e.g. friends sitting close on a park bench in silence).

Emotional intimacy depends primarily on the degree of closeness, as well as the nature of the relationship and the culture in which it is observed. Emotional intimacy is different from sexual intimacy in that sexual intimacy can take place with or without emotional intimacy. Sexual intimacy differs from emotional intimacy because the latter often does not require any kind of sexual context. Emotional intimacy is a psychological event that happens when trust levels and communication between two people are such that it fosters the mutual sharing of one another's deepest selves.  Depending on the background and conventions of the participants, emotional intimacy might involve disclosing thoughts, feelings and emotions in order to reach an understanding, offer mutual support or build a sense of community. Or it might involve sharing a duty, without commentary.

Deep intimacy requires a high level of transparency and openness. Closeness and vulnerability, which may be uncomfortable for some, are major pieces to emotional intimacy. This includes discussing both the positive and negative characteristics about one another. Conversation is a key point in every emotional intimate relationship. For example, a long-distance relationship is mostly based on conversation, along with a good balance of virtual sexual intimacy. A long-distance relationship can be stronger, in comparison to a normal one, because it forces the two partners to enhance the conversation process by asking productive questions to ensure mutual communication. There are great moments and also tough moments that come with any relationship. It is important to practice emotional intimacy in relationships and a lack of emotional intimacy could be solved by taking the time to be with your partner throughout the duration of your relationships. Many specialists suggest that talking about problems as soon as they arise is wise to continue emotional intimacy. Being honest, expressing appreciation, and routinely communicating also keeps stable emotional intimacy.

Emotional Intimacy Scale 

The 5-item Emotional Intimacy Scale (EIS) is a scale which enables an evaluation of the emotional intimacy in a relationship. Its goal is to predict the different outcomes produced by the existence of an intimate relationship.

This scale is created with a study of different items which are fundamental components of an intimate relationship. Some persons need to answer to a questionnaire. They answer to judge the degree of truth of each of these components in comparison with their actual situation. There are five of them: 
  This person completely accepts me as I am
  I can openly share my deepest thoughts and feelings with this person
  This person cares deeply for me
  This person would willingly help me in any way
  My thoughts and feelings are understood and affirmed by this person
These results are putting in correlation with specific values which characterize an individual such as psychological and physical well-being, social support, and health.

The results provided by the scale prove a positive relationship between an increase of EIS and an increase for the individual of social support, self-efficiency, life satisfaction and other positive effects. It also shows the negative relation between a decrease of EIS and an increase of stress, pain, and fatigue for the individual. An intimate relationship gives a sentiment of purpose and belonging which increases the physiological and psychological well-being.

See also

References

Communication
Interpersonal relationships
Emotion
Intimate relationships